Kernel is an EP by indie rock band Seam. It was released on February 15, 1993 through Touch and Go Records. It contains two new songs, an alternate take of "Shame" and a cover of Breaking Circus.

Track listing

Personnel 
Seam
John McEntire – drums
Lexi Mitchell – bass guitar
Sooyoung Park – vocals, guitar
Production and additional personnel
Seam – production
Brad Wood – engineering

References

External links 
 

1993 EPs
Seam (band) albums
Touch and Go Records EPs